Future of the Past is Destiny's fifth album. Released in 2004, it was the band's first album featuring former Falconer frontman Kristoffer Göbel on vocals. This album is the first one being recorded in the band's own studio DRS (later mixed at StudiOmega by Christian Silver).

Track listing
Music by Stefan Björnshög and lyrics by Kristoffer Göbel for all tracks, except where noted.
"Holy Man" 5:08
"Sabotage" 4:14
"In The Shadow Of The Rainbow" 4:54 
"Magic Forest" 5:34 
"Angels" 5:29  (Music by Anders Fagerstrand)
"Flying Dutchman" 4:57 
"On The Outside" 6:34 
"Ghost Train" 4:32
"Future Of The Past" 8:23

Credits 
Vocals: Kristoffer Göbel
Bass: Stefan Björnshög
Guitar: Anders Fagerstrand
Guitar: Niclas Granath
Guitar: Janne Ekberg
Drums: Birger Löfman

Special Guest Musicians:
Mats Olausson: Keyboards on Future Of The Past
Zenny Gram: Backing Vocals on Future Of The Past
Helena Johansson: Female Vocals on Flying Dutchman
Fredrik Johansson: Growl Vocals, Backing Vocals on Holy Man and Backing Vocals on Future Of The Past

2004 debut albums
Destiny (band) albums